"Diane" (also known as "Diane (I'm in Heaven When I See You Smile)") is a song by Ernö Rapée and Lew Pollack, and was originally written as a theme song for the 1927 silent movie Seventh Heaven. The song title is sometimes mistakenly referred to as "My Diane" or confused with the Beach Boys song "My Diane", which is a different song.

Hit versions
In 1928, the Nat Shilkret Orchestra had a major hit with the song and other successful versions that year were by Nathan Glantz and by Franklyn Baur.
The song was a popular single by Irish band The Bachelors, which was released on January 25, 1964 on the Decca label (Decca F11799) and produced by Shel Talmy. It reached number-one in the UK Singles Chart, number two in Ireland and number three in Australia. The Bachelors were the first act from the Republic of Ireland to have a number-one single in the UK charts. In the US, "Diane" was the Bachelors most successful single, peaking at number 10 on the Billboard Hot 100 chart in 1964.

References

External links
October 7, 1927 waltz version, sung by the Troubadours

1927 songs
1964 singles
Decca Records singles
London Records singles
UK Singles Chart number-one singles
Songs with music by Ernö Rapée
Songs written by Lew Pollack
Songs written for films
Song recordings produced by Shel Talmy
The Bachelors songs